Arambooyeh is a village in the Central District of Pakdasht County, Tehran Province, Iran. At the 2006 census, its population was 1,577, in 382 families.

References 

Populated places in Pakdasht County